Living with Your Ghost is the fourth solo studio album by United States-based blues rock singer/songwriter/guitarist from Australia, Kara Grainger. It was released on 1 June 2018.

Development
The album was recorded at the Wire Recording Studio in Austin, Texas. Grainger wrote or co-wrote all but one of the songs on the album, the exception being a cover of her friend Jackie Bristow's song "Broken Record". The album ranges from blues rock, rock and roll, and Americana.

Track listing

Personnel 
Musicians
Kara Grainger - vocals, guitar
Anders Osborne - guitar, backing vocals
Ivan Neville - keys, backing vocals
Dave Monsey - bass
J.J. Johnson - drums
Mark Rudin - trumpet
George Stanford - trombone
The Texas Horns
Mark "Kaz" Kazanoff - tenor saxophone
John Mills - baritone saxophone
Al Gomez - trumpet
James Fenner - congas

Production
Produced by Anders Osborne and Kara Grainger
Executive production by Don Ritter
Engineered by Stuart Sullivan
Additional engineering by Don Ritter
Additional engineering by Carter Greeves
Mastered by William Bowden

References

2018 albums
Kara Grainger albums